O2 (also known as Dawn of War in the UK) is a 2020 Estonian-Latvian-Lithuanian-Finnish historical spy thriller film, directed by Margus Paju, starring Sampo Sarkala, Kaspars Znotiņš, Elmo Nüganen, Rein Oja and Tambet Tuisk. The film is about the Estonian intelligence officer Feliks Kangur (played Priit Võigemast) tried to find out a traitor in the secret service in 1939, on the eve of Estonia losing its independence. The film was written by Tom Abrams, Tiit Aleksejev, Eriikka Etholén-Paju and Olle Mirme.

The film was produced by Nafta Films (Estonia) and Taska Film (Estonia), and coproduced by Film Angels Studio (Latvia), IN SCRIPT (Lithuania) and Finland's Solar Films. It was supported by the Estonian Film Institute. The film was released in cinemas in Estonia on 9 October 2020.

Cast
Priit Võigemast as Feliks Kangur
Kaspars Znotiņš as Ivan Kostrov
Agnese Cīrule as Maria Dubrawska
Ieva Andrejevaitė as Tatjana Kostrova
Tiit Lilleorg as Professor
Sampo Sarkola as Finnish spy Hannu
Pääru Oja as Peeter Parik
Tambet Tuisk as Johan Sõber
Rein Oja as Colonel Saar
Elmo Nüganen as Major Kurg
Vaidotas Martinaitis as NKVD interrogator
Valentin Novopolskij as Red Army major Kozlov
Indrek Ojari as Andres Piirisild
Alo Kõrve as Paul Parik
Hele Kõrve as Edith Parik
Amanda Hermiine Künnapas as Johan Sõber's lover
Doris Tislar as Linda Ahven
Gilberto Pulga as French Ambassador
Dainis Sumišķis as Kirill Kozlov
Gatis Gāga as GRU agent Zorin
Tõnu Oja as Factory manager
Johan Kristjan Aimla as Second Lieutenant Toomas Otsing
Lukas Petrauskas as Red Army first lietunant Krinski
Marek Rosenberg as Soldier
Kristiina-Hortensia Port as Woman at telephone exchange
Taavo Vellend as Man at tennis court

References

External links
O2 at Estonian film database

Estonian thriller films
2020 thriller films
2020 war drama films
World War II spy films
2020s spy thriller films
Estonian-language films
Finnish thriller drama films
Latvian thriller films
Lithuanian thriller films